The Denso Iris are a basketball team based in Kariya, Aichi, playing in the Women's Japan Basketball League.

Denso Iris uses Wing Arena Kariya as its home arena.

Notable players
Arisa Fujiwara
Kumiko Ōba
Maki Takada
Atsuko Watanabe

Coaches
 
Hirofumi Kojima
Vladimir Vuksanović

References

External links
 Official website

Basketball teams in Japan
Basketball teams established in 1962
1962 establishments in Japan